Sirjaron (also Romanized as Sīrjāron) is a village in Dabuy-ye Shomali Rural District, Sorkhrud District, Mahmudabad County, Mazandaran Province, Iran. At the 2016 census, its population was 450, in 118 families.

References 

Populated places in Mahmudabad County